David Giuseppe Sani (1828–1914) was an Italian painter, mainly of genre subjects.

He was born and resident in Florence. Among his works: La vocazione della Musica; La ricreazione; exhibited in Florence in 1882. In 1884, at the Exhibition of the Society for the Encouragement of Fine Arts in Florence, he displayed three paintings depicting : In guarda roba; Che bel colore!; and La piccola massaia.

References

1864 births
1889 deaths
19th-century Italian painters
Italian male painters
Italian genre painters
Painters from Florence
19th-century Italian male artists